Bon Accord is a rural locality in the North Burnett Region, Queensland, Australia.

Geography 
The locality is bounded to the north-west and west by the Burnett River.

The Bon Accord Wetherton Road enters the locality from the south (Gayndah) and exits to the north (Wetherton).

The predominant land use is grazing on native vegetation with some crop growing near the Burnett River and its tributary Barambah Creek.

History 
Bon Accord Provisional School opened about September 1901. It became Bon Accord State School on 1 January 1909. Due to low attendances, it closed about May 1922. It was located on the eastern bank of Barambah Creek immediately north of the Bon Accord Wetheron Road (approx ).

Education 
There are no schools in Bon Accord. The nearest government primary school is Gayndah State School in neighbouring Gayndah to the south-west. The nearest government secondary school is Burnett State College, also in Gayndah to the south-west.

References

Further reading 

 
c

North Burnett Region
Localities in Queensland